Xenodiscula venezuelensis is a species of air-breathing land snail, a gastropod in the family Sagdidae. This species is found in  Venezuela.

Sources 
Baker, Horace Burrinton. 1926: The mollusca collected by the University of Michigan-Williamson Expedition in Venezuela. Occasional Papers of the Museum of Zoology University of Michigan. Nº 167

Sagdidae
Gastropods described in 1919